Portglenone Parish Church is the Church of Ireland parish church of Portglenone, County Antrim, Northern Ireland.

Description
Portglenone Church was consecrated in 1735, making it one of the oldest churches in the area. The porch was added and dedicated on 13 February 1912. The church was re-roofed in 1929.

External links
Ahoghill and Portglenone - The Church of Ireland Diocese of Connor

County Antrim
Church of Ireland church buildings in Northern Ireland
Churches completed in 1735